In Color or In Colour may refer to:

 In Color (album), a 1977 album by Cheap Trick
 "In Color" (song), a song by Jamey Johnson
 In Colour (The Concretes album), 2006
 In Colour (Jamie xx album), 2015
 ...In Color, a 2008 EP by The Summer Set

See also
 Color photography
 Film colorization
 Color television
 Color (disambiguation)